The 2022 Redditch Borough Council elections took place on 5 May 2022 to elect members of Redditch Borough Council, a district-level local authority in Worcestershire, England.

Results summary

Ward results

Abbey

Astwood Bank & Feckenham

Batchley & Brockhill

Central

Church Hill

Crabbs Cross

Greenlands

Headless Cross & Oakenshaw

Lodge Park

Winyates

References

Redditch Borough Council election
2022
2020s in Worcestershire
May 2022 events in the United Kingdom